Limoilou may refer to:

 La Cité-Limoilou, a borough of Quebec City
 Limoilou (electoral district), a former provincial electoral district in Quebec
 Beauport—Limoilou, a Canadian federal electoral district located in Quebec
 Cégep Limoilou, a CEGEP (junior college) in Quebec